Taras Voznyak (born 11 May 1957) is a Ukrainian culturologist, political scientist, editor-in-chief and founder of Independent Cultural Journal "Ї", director of the Lviv National Art Gallery, laureate of the Vasyl Stus Prize (2021).

Biography 

Taras Voznyak was born after his father returned from exile in Magadan (exile lasted from 1945 to 1956). The family settled in the town of Broshniv-Osada.
 1974–1979 – Taras Voznyak studies at Lviv Polytechnic Institute (currently Lviv Polytechnic National University)
 1980–1984 – Taras Voznyak serves as an officer in the armed forces in the town of Iziaslav of Khmelnytskyi Oblast. During army service he translates philosophy works by Edmund Husserl, Roman Ingarden, Gabriel Marcel, Martin Heidegger, Hans-Georg Gadamer, and Max Scheler.
 After demobilisation in 1984, Taras Voznyak starts working as a programmer at Lviv Factory of Milling Machines. After Gorbachev's thaw he becomes an activist of democratic movement and co-organises the first general strike in Ukraine (at Lviv Factory of Milling Machines).

Taras Voznyak was close to an informal group of intellectuals united under the name "Lvivska Shkola" (Lviv School). Ihor Klekh, Hryhoriy Komskyi, Mykola Yakovyna and others were part of this group, which was operating in Lviv in the 1980s. He organised the printing of samizdat culturology literature. He translated a large number of texts and also published within samizdat, in particularly the books of Polish-Jewish writer Bruno Schulz.

Editor – Independent Cultural Journal "Ї" 

In 1987 Taras Voznyak together with Mykola Yakovyna initiated the creation of the Independent Cultural Journal. The name of the Journal – "Ї" – was thought up by Ukrainian translator Hryhoriy Kochur and linguist Yuriy Shevelyov during the meeting in Lviv.

The first issue of the Independent Cultural Journal "Ї" was published in 1989. Since then Taras Voznyak remains the Journal's editor-in-chief and publisher. With the support from Reform Movement of Lithuania "Sajudis", the first five Journal issues were manufactured as photocopies in Vilnius. The photocopies would be brought to Lviv, and then they were stitched and distributed nationally in Ukraine. This is when Oleksandr Kryvenko, the editor of samvydav Lviv newspaper "Postup", joined the Journal team. In 1995 the Journal was officially registered – Taras Voznyak, Mykhaylo Moskal and Oleksandr Pohranychnyi became the Journal founders.

Independent Cultural Journal "Ї" is published in paper and electronic form. The Journal has long ago transformed into an influential NGO and a think tank. The main issues, which the NGO Independent Cultural Journal "Ї" is working upon, are the issues of civil society, human rights, interethnic relations, cross-border cooperation, multiculturalism, European integration, regionalism, globalisation and anti-globalist movements, ecumenical dialogue, political changes in the region.

As a leader of NGO Independent Cultural Journal "Ї" Taras Voznyak organises and holds numerous international, national and local conferences, meetings, round table discussion, and other events. He is the initiator and organiser of community campaigns on the promotion of cultural heritage of Halychyna – in particular the sculptor of 18th century Johann-Georg Pinzel, writer and painter Bruno Schulz, writer Zygmunt Haupt.

Journal "Ї" has become a cult publication in Lviv. Journal's series have been reconstructing local identities of Halychyna, Volyn, Zakarpattya, Bukovina for many years. Several Journal issues have been promoting the almost non-existent Polish, Jewish and Armenian cultural landscapes of the region – Polish, Jewish and Armenian "uni-verse" of Halychyna. A range of Journal issues is dedicated to phenomena of the cities – Lviv, Chernivtsi, Ivano-Frankivsk, Ternopil, Kolomyja, Zhovkva.

In 2001, an honorary distinction "Order for Intellectual Bravery" was established (initiated by Taras Voznyak and Oleksandr Pohranychnyi), which since then has been accepted by Borys Tarasyuk, Nataliya Yakovenko, Myroslav Popovych, Emma Andijevska, Roman Viktyuk, Vyacheslav Bryukhovetskyi, Valentyn Sylvestrov, Myroslav Marynovych, Hryhoriy Hrabovych, Andrzej Nikodemowicz, Borys Gudzyak, Pavlo Chuchka, Yevhen Zakharov, Roman Petruk, Bohdan Osadchuk, Leonid Finberg, Mustafa Jemilev, Anatoliy Hrytsenko, Ihor Isichenko, Oksana Pakhlyovska, Andriy Sodomora, Igor Shevchenko, Yaroslav Grytsak, Aleksandra Gnatyuk, Moses Fishbein, Bohdan Soroka, Bohdan Havrylyshyn, Mykola Kniazhyckyi, Karmela Cepkolenko, Kostiantyn Sigov, Ruslana Lazhychko, Vladyslav Troickyi,  Bogumila Berdychovska, Tiberij Silvashi, Iza Chruslinska, Taras Prochasko, Oksana Lyniv, Yavhen Bystryckyi, Paweł Piotr Smoleński, Yosyf Zisels, Patriarch Filaret, Stanisław Rosiek, Tamara Hundorova, Oleksander Roitburd, Roman Kis, Orest Drul, Taras Kompanichenko, Yuriy Shcherbak, Petro Rykhlo, Andrey Piontkovsky.

Public Life and Opinion Journalism 

During the 1990s Taras Voznyak has started to actively publish his culturology essays in Ukraine as well as abroad. He is the author of more than 400 publications in Ukrainian and foreign media; he also writes for the following magazines: "Ї", "Suchasnist" (Contemporary Times), "Kyiv", "Philosophical and Sociological Thought", "Krytyka" (Criticism), "Geneza" (Genesis), "Universum" (Universe), "Glavred" (Chief Editor); newspapers: "Den" (Day), "Dzerkalo Tyzhnya" (Mirror Weekly), "Gazeta Po-Ukrainsky", "Ukraina Moloda" (Young Ukraine), "Ukrainskyi Tyzhden" (Ukrainian Week), blogs: Ukrainska pravda

From the time Ukraine won its independence, Taras Voznyak has continuously been involved in establishing cross-border cooperation and maintaining international relations, while holding various official posts.

Taras Voznyak was awarded with an honorary distinction "Knight of Halychyna" in the nomination "Public Figure" (2001), a distinction "20 Years of the First Democratic Convocation of Lviv Regional Council" (2010), a distinction by Lviv Mayor "Saint George Distinction of Honour" (2011), Cross of Merit (Poland, 2014), a distinction of Polish-Ukrainian Ignacy Jan Paderewski Foundation (2014), Honorary award "100th anniversary of the proclamation of the Western Ukrainian People's Republic" (2018), laureate of the Vasyl Stus Prize (2021).

 1989–present – Head of the Board of Directors of NGO International Centre for Cultural Initiatives, Lviv
 1996–1999 – Head of the Publishing Council of International Renaissance Foundation, Kyiv
 1998–present – Member (Pastpresident 2015–2016) of "Lviv-Leopolis" Rotary Club, Lviv
 2002–2004 – Head of the Steering Council of the "East-East Programme: Partnership Beyond Borders" of International Renaissance Foundation, Kyiv
 2000–2004 – Committee Member of Taras Shevchenko National Award of Ukraine, Kyiv
 2005–present – Co-founder and Head of the Board of Directors of Polish-Ukrainian Cooperation Foundation (PAUCI), Warsaw-Kyiv
 2009–present – Member of the Board of Directors of International Renaissance Foundation, Kyiv
 2012 – Member and Executive Director (2013-2017) of the Ukrainian Center of International PEN-Club, Kyiv
 2014 – Candidate for Ukrainian Parliament in the 122nd electoral district
 2010–present – Member of the International Council on Monuments and Sites – ICOMOS, Kyiv-Lviv
 2016–present – Director of the Lviv National Art Gallery
 2017–2019 – Member of the Ukrainian-Polish Forum (Ministrys of Internal Affairs of Ukraine and Poland)

Published works 

 Voznyak Т. Texts and Translations, Kharkiv, "Folio", 1998, 667 p., 
 Voznyak Т. Philosophy of Language, Lviv, "Ї", 2009, 180 p., 
 Voznyak Т. Phenomenon of the City, Lviv, "Ї", 2009, 290 p., 
 Voznyak Т. Philosophical Essays, Lviv, "Ї", 2009, 300 p., 
 Voznyak Т. Retrospective Political Science. Kuchma's Era: "Ї", 2010, 180 p., 
 Voznyak Т. Retrospective Political Science. Yushchenko's Era. Long Prelude, Lviv: "Ї", 2010, 264 p., 
 Voznyak Т. Retrospective Political Science. Yushchenko's Era. Lost Expectations, Lviv: "Ї", 2010, 202 p., 
 Voznyak Т. Retrospective Political Science. Yanukovych's Era – I, Lviv: "Ї", 2010, 122 p., 
 Voznyak Т. Galician Stetles,  Lviv: "Ї", 2010, 444 c., 
 Voznyak Т. Tα μετα τα φυσικά of Carpathians. Selected Epiphanies, Lviv: "Ї", 2011, 200 p., 
 Voznyak Т. Bruno Schulz. The Return, Lviv: "Ї", 2012, 218 p., 
 Voznyak Т. Retrospective Political Science. Yanukovych's Era – II. Then came Freedom – VO Svoboda, Lviv: «Ї», 2013, 544 p., 
 Voznyak Т. Retrospective Political Science. Yanukovych's Era – III, Agony of Regime, Lviv: «Ї», 2010, 456 p., 
 Voznyak Т. Фαινόμενο of the Place, Lviv: «Ї», Selected Epiphanies, 2014, 106 p. 
 Voznyak Т. Geopolitical Contexts of the War in Ukraine, Lviv: «Ї», 2015, 220 p., 
 Voznyak Т. Philosophical Essays, Kyiv, Duch i Litera, 2016, 590 p. 
 Voznyak Т. Language and Place, Kyiv, Duch i Litera, 2017, 467 p. 
 Voznyak Т. Retrospective Political Science. Poroshenko Era. War, Lviv: «Ї», 2017, 300 p.
 Voznyak Т. Retrospective Political Science. Poroshenko Era. System Resistance, Lviv: «Ї», 2017, 475 p.
 Voznyak Т. Bruno Schulz. The Return, Kyiv, Duch i Litera, 2017, 196 p. 
 Voznyak Т. Judaica Galiciensia, Kyiv, Duch i Litera, 2017, 546 p., 
 Voznyak Т. Cultural Essays, Kyiv, Duch i Litera, 2018, 252 p., 
 Voznyak Т. Political Essays, Kyiv, Duch i Litera, 2018, 498 p., 
 Voznyak Т. A Small Galician Encyclopedia: a Joke and Seriously, Lviv, Rastr 7, 2020, 368 p., 
 Voznyak Т. Art Essays I, Kyiv, Duch i Litera, 2020, 258 p., 
 Voznyak Т. Art Essays II, Kyiv, Duch i Litera, 2022, 256 p., 
 Voznyak Т. Speeches on the Boundary of the Year, Lviv: «Ї», 2022, 116 p.,

References 

 Independent Cultural Journal "Ї"

Additional sources of information 

 Алла Татаренко. Српска књижевност као огледало балканске драме — Белград, Борба — 31 березня 2000 року
 Ukraina: brak pomysłu na państwo — Краків, Tygodnik Powszechny — No.26 (2712), 30 червня 2001 року
 Уляна Івашків. Ушанування інтелектуально відважних — Львів, Поступ — 24 грудня 2002 року
 Ігор Мельник. Діалог між народами — Львів, Поступ — 14 травня 2004
 Яна Кутько. Про що говорить тринадцята літера алфавіту? — Київ, День — No.182, 9 жовтня 2004 року
 Михаил Гольд. Евреи в Галиции. Оконченный роман? — Ежемесячный литературно-публицистический журнал и издательство Лехаим — лютий 2009 року
 Валерий Сердюченко. Клубы львовских интеллектуалов — Нью-Йорк, Лебедь — No. 299, 24 листопада 2002 року
 Ірина Сиривко. Тарас Возняк: Нагорода стимулює працювати краще — Львів, Поступ — 22 січня 2004 року
 Володимир Цибулько. Філософ західної брами раю — Київ, Україна молода — No.82, 11 травня 2007 року

1957 births
Living people
Journalists from Lviv
Translators to Ukrainian
Ukrainian democracy activists
Ukrainian political scientists
Ukrainian writers
Lviv Polytechnic alumni
People from Ivano-Frankivsk Oblast